Henry Thomas W. Bowl (born 14 April 1914) was an English professional footballer. He played for Swindon Town, Blackpool and Exeter City.

Career
Bowl began his career with Clanfield, and then moved to Stanford in the Vale, where he was quickly signed up by Swindon Town in 1933. He made 44 Football League appearances for the club in two years, scoring eight goals. In 1936 he joined Blackpool. He played two League games for the Seasiders, scoring in one of them. The following year he signed for Exeter City, for whom he made 79 League appearances and scored 43 goals.

After finishing his professional career at Lancaster Town he was given a permit by the FA to allow him to play for Clanfield as a former professional.

References 

1914 births
Year of death missing
People from Newbury, Berkshire
English footballers
Swindon Town F.C. players
Blackpool F.C. players
Exeter City F.C. players
Lancaster City F.C. players
Association football forwards